Une chambre en ville (also known as A Room in Town) is a 1982 French musical drama film written and directed by Jacques Demy, with music by Michel Colombier, and starring Dominique Sanda, Danielle Darrieux and Michel Piccoli. It is set against the backdrop of a workers' strike in 1955 Nantes. Like Demy's most famous film, The Umbrellas of Cherbourg, it is an operetta-musical in which every line of dialogue is sung. However, unlike Cherbourg, Chambre is closer to tragedy, with a darker, more explicitly political tone.

The film won the Prix Méliès, and was nominated for nine César Awards: Best Film, Best Director, Most Promising Actress, Best Supporting Actor, Best Supporting Actress, Best Cinematography, Best Music, Best Production Design and Best Sound.

Plot
The story is set during a workers' strike in Nantes in 1955. Young shipyard worker François Guilbaud is one of the strikers, and he rents a room from Madame Langlois, a widow who sympathizes with the strikers although she is herself upper-class, born a baroness. His girlfriend Violette Pelletier, who works in a shop and lives with her mother,  wants to get married but he is unwilling, partly because they have no money and nowhere to live.

In the street François is accosted by a beautiful woman wearing only a fur coat. This is Édith Leroyer, unhappily married to the owner of a television shop, who has taken to part-time prostitution. The two have a blissful night together in a cheap hotel and fall in love.

In the morning Violette comes looking for François because she has learned she is pregnant, but he tells her  he loves another woman. Meanwhile, Édith, going back to her husband's shop to collect some things and leave him, has a terrible row with him during which he cuts his throat. She flees back to her mother, who is François' landlady. Next morning, François joins a demonstration which is broken up by the police and is fatally injured. His workmates carry him up to the flat of the baroness, where he dies in the arms of Édith. Unable to live without him, she shoots herself.

Cast
Dominique Sanda - Edith Leroyer
Danielle Darrieux - Margot Langlois
Richard Berry - François Guilbaud
Michel Piccoli - Edmond Leroyer
Fabienne Guyon - Violette Pelletier
Anna Gaylor - Madame Pelletier
Jean-François Stévenin - Dambiel
Jean-Louis Rolland - Ménager
Marie-France Roussel - Mme Sforza
Georges Blaness - Chef des CRS
Yann Dedet - Ouvrier
Nicolas Hossein - Ouvrier
Gil Warga - Ouvrier
Antoine Mikola - Ouvrier
Marie-Pierre Feuillard - Femme à l'enfant

External links

 
Une chambre en ville: Love and Death an essay by Geoff Andrew at the Criterion Collection

1980s musical films
1982 films
Films directed by Jacques Demy
Films set in Nantes
French musical films
Sung-through musical films
Films scored by Michel Colombier
1980s French films